"A Little Too Not Over You" is the official second single by American Idol season 7 runner-up David Archuleta, taken from his self-titled debut album.  It released to radio on January 6, 2009.
On the Radio Disney Music Mailbag, this song got 99% of the votes to pick it.
Archuleta confirmed the song's release on his official MySpace page. The song charted on the Billboard Bubbling Under Hot 100 Singles at number 14, having sold a total of 247,000 copies as of March 4, 2010.

Tracklist 

Remixes EP
"A Little Too Not Over You" (Tonal Remix) – 3:39
"A Little Too Not Over You" (Jason Nevins Club Mix) – 6:56
"A Little Too Not Over You" (Jason Nevins Radio Mix) – 3:50
"A Little Too Not Over You" (Mental Instruments Remix) – 2:54
"A Little Too Not Over You" (Instrumental Version) – 3:16
"A Little Too Not Over You" (Acapella Version) – 3:16

Other Versions
 Sonic Ether Remix (4:01)
 BabieBoyBlew Video Remix (3:45)

Music video 
A music video was shot with director Scott Speer in late November.
The video premiered on December 15, 2008, on Yahoo! Music. It features Archuleta looking through pictures on a camera which is an Exilim S10, and reflecting on a relationship with a girl. The video became available for download on iTunes on December 23, 2008.

Personnel 
 David Archuleta – vocals
 Sean Hurley – bass
 Randy Cooke – drums
 Mike Krompass – electric guitar, acoustic guitar
 Dapo Torimiro – keyboards
 Storm Lee Gardner – backing vocals

References 

2009 singles
David Archuleta songs
Music videos directed by Scott Speer
Pop ballads
Songs written by Matthew Gerrard
Songs written by Robbie Nevil
Song recordings produced by Robbie Nevil
2008 songs
Song recordings produced by Matthew Gerrard
Jive Records singles